Mary Lou Kent (October 3, 1921 – March 9, 1981) was an American businesswoman and politician.

Born in Quincy, Illinois, Kent went to the University of Colorado and Michigan State University. She worked as an administrative assistant for the Quincy Chamber of Commerce. In 1973, Kent served in the Illinois House of Representatives as a Republican. In the 1980 general election, Kent defeated Democratic candidate George Lewis, a delegate to the 1970 Illinois Constitutional Convention, for the seat in the Illinois Senate being vacated by John Linebaugh Knuppel's run for the United States House of Representatives. She died of a heart attack while in a car in an Quincy shopping mall in Quincy, Illinois. Her daughter Laura Kent Donahue succeeded her mother in the Illinois Senate.

Notes

1921 births
1981 deaths
People from Quincy, Illinois
University of Colorado alumni
Michigan State University alumni
Businesspeople from Illinois
Women state legislators in Illinois
Republican Party members of the Illinois House of Representatives
Republican Party Illinois state senators
20th-century American businesspeople
20th-century American businesswomen
20th-century American politicians
20th-century American women politicians